Margaret of Huntingdon (1145 – 1201) was a Scottish princess and Duchess of Brittany. She was the sister of Scottish kings Malcolm IV and William I, wife of Conan IV, Duke of Brittany, and the mother of Constance, Duchess of Brittany. Her second husband was Humphrey de Bohun, hereditary Constable of England. Following her second marriage, Margaret styled herself as the Countess of Hereford.

Life
Margaret's parents were Henry of Scotland, Earl of Huntingdon and Northumbria, and Ada de Warenne. She has traditionally been considered the second-eldest daughter, younger than Ada, but it is possible that Margaret was the eldest since she married before Ada and was named after their paternal great-grandmother Saint Margaret (while Ada was named after their maternal great-grandmother Adelaide of Vermandois).

In 1160, Margaret became Duchess of Brittany and Countess of Richmond by marrying her first husband, Conan IV, Duke of Brittany, Earl of Richmond. Margaret's origins and first marriage were deduced by Benedict of Peterborough. Together Conan and Margaret had at least four children:
 Constance, Duchess of Brittany (c. 1161 – September 1201), married firstly in 1181, Geoffrey Plantagenet, by whom she had three children, including Arthur I of Brittany; she married secondly in 1188, Ranulph de Blondeville, 4th Earl of Chester; she married thirdly in 1199, Guy of Thouars, by whom she had twin daughters, including Alix of Thouars;
 At least two children who died young;
 William (d. aft. 1199/1201).

Margaret's husband died in February 1171, leaving her a widow at the age of twenty-six. Shortly before Easter 1171, she married her second husband, Humphrey III de Bohun, Hereditary Constable of England (c. 1155 – c. 1181). He was the son of Humphrey de Bohun and Margaret of Hereford. Hereafter, she styled herself Countess of Hereford. The marriage produced a son and a daughter:
 Henry de Bohun, 1st Earl of Hereford (1176 – 1 June 1220), a Magna Carta surety; he married Maud FitzGeoffrey, daughter of Geoffrey Fitz Peter, 1st Earl of Essex by his first wife Beatrice de Say, having three children including Humphrey de Bohun, 2nd Earl of Hereford, ancestor of the later Bohun earls of Hereford;
 Matilda (d. aft. 1184/1185).

Margaret's second husband died in late 1181 and she then married the English nobleman Sir William fitz Patrick de Hertburn who acquired the lands of Washington in Durham in 1183. This marriage also produced three children:
 Walter de Washington;
 Sir William de Washington (c. 1183 – c. 1239), he married Alice de Lexington by whom he had issue. The Washington family descends from William;
 Marjory de Washington, she married firstly David de Lindsay, and secondly Sir Malcolm FitzWaldeve, a.k.a. Sir Malcolm de Ingoe.

Margaret died in 1201 and was buried in Sawtry Abbey, Huntingdonshire. Her third and final husband had died around 1194.

Portrayals in literature 
Margaret of Huntingdon is a secondary character in the novel Devil's Brood (2008) by Sharon Kay Penman.

Notes

References

Sources

|-

12th-century births
1201 deaths
House of Dunkeld
Duchesses of Brittany
Scottish princesses
Bohun family
12th-century Scottish women
12th-century Scottish people
12th-century French women
12th-century French people
12th-century Breton people